Ivan Veras (born 22 April 1997) is a Belarusian professional footballer who plays as a midfielder for I-League club Aizawl.

References

External links 
 
 

1997 births
Living people
Footballers from Minsk
Belarusian footballers
Association football midfielders
Belarusian expatriate footballers
Expatriate footballers in the Maldives
FC Belshina Bobruisk players
FC Chist players
FC Granit Mikashevichi players
FC Smolevichi players
FC Krumkachy Minsk players
United Victory players
Aizawl FC players
Expatriate footballers in India